Swimming competitions at the 2015 Southeast Asian Games was held at the OCBC Aquatic Centre in the Singapore Sports Hub in Kallang, Singapore from 6 to 11 June 2015. Built only a year earlier, the venue is hosting the Southeast Asian Games for the first time. It was used to host the second Southeast Asian Swimming Championships in 2014 as a test bed for the organisers, with the 2015 Southeast Asian Games volunteers hired to also volunteer in the 2014 Swimming Championships to help in the familiarisation of the new venue.

With swimming being a traditional gold mine for Singapore having been the country's strongest sport, there were high expectations for the squad to deliver another record haul of medals, especially given that Singapore is the host country. Two male athletes in particular, namely Joseph Schooling and Quah Zheng Wen were expected to shoulder the responsibility for the hosts, being entered in nine and 12 events respectively. Other athletes expected to shine include Quah Ting Wen, Tao Li and Danny Yeo.

This Aquatics discipline featured 38 long course events: 19 for males and 19 for females. This restores six events which were dropped by the previous host, Myanmar in the 2013 edition.

Indonesia, Thailand and Vietnam were expecting to present the most resistance to Singapore's ambitions. In particular, Nguyễn Thị Ánh Viên from Vietnam contested strongly especially in 12 events.

Participating nations
A total of 129 athletes from nine nations competed in swimming at the 2015 Southeast Asian Games:

Events 
In most editions of the games, the swimming programme follows closely with the Olympics swimming programme, offering 32 pool events except the two 10 km open-water marathons. However, in 2011, six more non-Olympic events, namely the shorter 50 metre events for backstroke, breaststroke and butterfly were included. Although these were again dropped in 2013, Singapore re-introduced the 38-event programme to capitalise on its strength in swimming.

The following events were contested (all pool events were long course, and distances are in metres unless stated):
Freestyle: 50, 100, 200, 400, 800 (women), and 1,500 (men);
Backstroke: 50, 100 and 200;
Breaststroke: 50, 100 and 200;
Butterfly: 50, 100 and 200;
Individual medley: 200 and 400;
Relays: 4×100 free, 4×200 free; 4×100 medley

Schedule
The following is the competition schedule for the swimming competitions. As with previous editions of the games, the swimming programme schedule occurs in two segments, with the heats, if any, being conducted in the morning, followed by the final events during the evening sessions:

M = Morning session, E = Evening session

Results
Singapore produced its best performance in swimming in the Southeast Asian Games, taking more than half of the total gold medals offered. Joseph Schooling and Quah Zheng Wen won ten of these medals and broke nine games records, with Schooling winning all of his events and Quah winning four. Quah and Schooling also combined with their relay teams to games record-breaking wins in all three relays. The women's individual events were dominated by Nguyễn Thị Ánh Viên of Vietnam, who won eight gold medals. The Singaporean women combined to win seven individual events as well as all three relays, breaking the games record in the 4x100 medley.

Medal summary
Key

Men

Women

Records broken

Men 

 Record was set during the Men's 4 × 200 m freestyle relay

Women

See also
 Swimming at the 2015 ASEAN Para Games

References

External links
 

 
Kallang